Grassmoor railway station is a disused station serving the suburb of Hasland in Chesterfield and village of Grassmoor, Derbyshire, England. It operated from 1893 until 1940.

The station was on the Manchester, Sheffield and Lincolnshire Railway which was amalgamated into the Great Central Chesterfield Loop which ran between Staveley Central and Heath Junction (just north of Heath railway station) on the Great Central Main Line.

References

Disused railway stations in Derbyshire
Former Great Central Railway stations
Railway stations in Great Britain opened in 1893
Railway stations in Great Britain closed in 1940